This is a list of butterfly species recorded in Iberian Peninsula (Portugal and Spain) with the Spanish common name.

Hesperiidae

Lycaenidae

Nymphalidae

Papilionidae

Pieridae 

Subfamily Coliadinae
Colias alfacariensis – colias de Berger
Colias crocea – amarilla
Colias phicomone – verdosa
Gonepteryx cleopatra – Cleopatra
Gonepteryx rhamni – limonera

Subfamily Dismorphiinae
Leptidea sinapis –  blanca esbelta
Leptidea reali –  blanca esbelta

Subfamily Pierinae
Anthocharis belia – bandera española
Anthocharis cardamines – musgosa
Aporia crataegi – blanca del majuelo
Artogeia ergane – blanca escasa
Colotis evagore – colotis del desierto
Euchloe bazae – puntaparda verdosa
Euchloe belemia – blanca verdirrayada
Euchloe crameri – blanquiverdosa moteada
Euchloe simplonia
Euchloe tagis – blanquiverdosa curva
Pieris brassicae – mariposa de la col
Pieris mannii – blanca catalana
Pieris napi – blanca verdinerviada

Pieris rapae – Blanquita de la col
Pontia daplidice – blanquiverdosa
Pontia callidice – blanquiverdosa alpina
Zegris eupheme – el zegrí

Riodinidae

References
  (2002): Guía de las mariposas de España y Europa. Barcelona: Lynx Edicions .

External links 
 Systematic List of species of Butterflies of the Iberian Peninsula and Spain. Archived from the original August 6, 2018.

Iberia
Butterflies
Butterflies
Butterflies
Iberia